Mud is an unincorporated community in Lincoln County, West Virginia, United States. Its post office  is closed.

The community was named after the nearby Mud River.

References

Unincorporated communities in West Virginia
Unincorporated communities in Lincoln County, West Virginia